Light Chasers is the tenth studio album by the American indie rock group Cloud Cult that was released in stores on September 14, 2010. It was previously released on the band's website via digital download and mail order on June 28, 2010.

Track list
All songs written by Craig Minowa.

References

2008 albums
Cloud Cult albums